The 2008 Football League Trophy Final was the 25th final of the domestic football cup competition for teams from Football Leagues One and Two, the Football League Trophy. The final was played at Wembley Stadium in London on 30 March 2008, the first time that the final had been staged at the stadium since it was rebuilt. The match was contested by Grimsby Town and Milton Keynes Dons. MK Dons won the match 2–0 with Keith Andrews and Sean O'Hanlon scoring the goals in the final 20 minutes.

Match details

EFL Trophy Finals
Trophy Final
Football League Trophy Final
Football League Trophy Final
Events at Wembley Stadium
Football League Trophy Final 2008
Football League Trophy Final 2008